The Ministry of Electricity, Water and Renewable Energy is one of the government agencies in the State of Kuwait. It was established on January 17, 1962 and was previously known as the Ministry of Electricity and Water until the name of Renewable Energy was added to the ministry. The ministry is responsible for providing electricity and water services to more than three million consumers. Its main office is located in the Safat, in the capital of Kuwait, and the currently minister is Amani Sulaiman Buqamaz.

Ministry tasks 
The Ministry of Electricity, Water and Renewable Energy is responsible for providing the country's needs of electric power and water for consumption and production purposes.
The Ministry is responsible for the following matters:

 Establishment, operation and management of electric power production plants that use fuel extracted from the earth, and electric power production plants that use clean energy or renewable energy.
 Establishing, operating and managing electric power transmission and distribution networks.
 Establishing, operating and managing water production and desalination plants.
 Establishment, operation and management of water storage stations and a network of transmission and distribution of water produced from water production and desalination plants or water extracted from the ground.
 Suggesting the state's general policy with regard to the production and consumption of water, electricity and renewable energy.
 Establishing, operating and managing stations for saving and storing surplus energy from electric or renewable energy sources.
 Establishing, operating and managing electric power distribution centers used in public and private transportation.
 Importing electrical energy through the electrical connection for use within the State of Kuwait or exporting it in a manner that does not conflict with the legislation in force in the State of Kuwait.
 Approval of technical specifications in the field of production, distribution and consumption of water and electric energy.
 Developing relations with Arab and foreign countries and organizations in matters of water, electric and renewable energy.
 Purchasing renewable energy produced from others, in light of the conditions and procedures set by the ministry in accordance with the applicable legislation within the State of Kuwait.
 Conducting scientific and practical research and studies independently or in cooperation with organizations of Arab or foreign countries, or in cooperation with specialized research centers in the field of production, transmission, storage and consumption of electric energy and water.
 Exploration of groundwater, preservation of the discovered places, and regulation of the extraction and use of groundwater.
 Conducting contracts for the purpose of electrical interconnection and the exchange of electrical energy with other countries, passing through the State of Kuwait.

Sources:

List of ministers 

Source:

References 

Ministries established in 1962
Government ministries of Kuwait
1962 establishments in Kuwait